

Ten-goal players
Mariano Aguerre - Argentina / USA
Alex Ferrer - Pompano Beach
Gerald Balding (1903–1957) - England's last 10 goal player
Adolfo Cambiaso  (born 1975) (h) - Argentina
Bartolomé Castagnola (born 1970) - Argentina
Ricky France-Lynch - England (fictional)
Bautista Heguy - Argentina / England
Tomas Hernández Gómez (born 1993) - Mexico / USA
Carlos Gracida  (1960–2014) (h) - Mexico
Ignacio Heguy - Argentina
Marcos Heguy - Argentina
Lewis Lawrence Lacey (1887–1966)
Pablo Mac Donough - Argentina / Spain / USA
Agustin Merlos - Argentina / Spain / USA
Lucas Monteverde - Argentina
Juan Martin Nero - Argentina / Spain
Miguel Novillo Astrada - Argentina
Facundo Pieres - Argentina / USA
Gonzalo Pieres (h) - Argentina / France
Aidan Roark (1905–1984) - Ireland
Nic Roldan - Argentina/USA
 Gen Joginder Singh - Patiala tiger team
 Col. Jaswant Singh - Patiala tiger team, India
Louis Ezekiel Stoddard (1881–1951) - United States
John Arthur Edward Traill (1882–1958)
Charles Buckingham - Australia / England

Best known outside of polo
Dennis Coleridge Boles
Winston Churchill
Joaquin Miguel Elizalde
Heino Ferch
Nacho Figueras
Martin Garrick
Flash Gordon (fictional)
Douglas Haig
Sue Sally Hale
Tommy Lee Jones
Lyndon Lea
Carlos Menditeguy
George Patton
Harry Payne Whitney
Mike Rutherford
Walt Disney
Enrique J. Zobel

Aristocracy, Heirs
George Spencer-Churchill, Marquess of Blandford

Royalty
British royal family
Louis Mountbatten
Charles III
Prince Philip, Duke of Edinburgh
William, Prince of Wales
Prince Harry, Duke of Sussex

Malaysian royal family
Ibrahim Ismail, Sultan (King) of Johore
Tunku Ismail Idris, Crown Prince of Johore
Tunku Idris Iskandar, Temenggong of Johore

References

PLayers